Samsung GT-B5310 is a type of Corby mobile phone, also known as Samsung Genio Slide or Samsung Corby Pro and was released in 2009. It was manufactured by Samsung Electronics. Later it was released for Canada, named GT-B5310R, and it was available through Rogers Wireless.

Outlook
The mobile has a mass of 135g. This mobile has the feature of QWERTY keyboard in it. It is shiny with a black panel.
Version with AZERTY keyboard exists also.

Features
The display is 240 × 320 pixels, (2.8 inches). The capability of its Phone-book is 1000 Contacts. The memory card capacity is till 16 GB.
It also supports WI-FI.

Camera

 Primary  : 3.15 MP, 2048 ×1536 pixels, video.
 Features : Geo-tagging, Smile detection, Panorama
 Video	    :320 × 240 pixels, QVGA@15fps.
 Secondary: available.

References

B5310
Mobile phones introduced in 2009
Slider phones